was a Japanese politician and businessman, member of the House of Representatives and of the House of Peers.

Background
Ozaki served as Shizuoka City Education Chairman, Shizuoka Taisei Junior/Senior High School, Shizuoka Blind Dormitory School President, high level positions in several banks, Shizuoka Veteran Association president and others. In addition, he created Shizuoka Shōnen Association (静岡少年軍団), a predecessor of Shizuoka Scout Council Boy Scouts, and also worked on social education for young people.

Yoshinori Futara, the head of school affairs for Shizuoka Prefecture, introduced Shō Fukao to Ozaki.  The Shizuoka Shōnen Gundan ("Shizuoka Boys' Army Corps") was formed in June 1913 with Ozaki as leader and Fukao and Keijirō Takasugi as directors. 111 members took part in the enrollment ceremony at Sengen Shrine. Takasugi wanted Fukao removed for his previous activity as a socialist, but Ozaki supported Fukao.

In 1955 he posthumously received the highest distinction of the Boy Scouts of Japan, the Golden Pheasant Award. His second son Tadatsugu Ozaki, a Boy Scouts of Japan pioneer and later Shizuoka Scout Council President, received the distinction in 1979. His third son Shinpei Iwanami, a President of TEPCO and Boy Scouts of Nippon director, received the distinction in 1994.

Notes

References

External links

 

Scouting in Japan
1870 births
Members of the House of Peers (Japan)
1945 deaths